David Summers may refer to:

 David Summers Rodríguez, Spanish musician and frontman of Hombres G
 David Summers (album), self-titled album by David Summers
 David Summers (art historian), American art historian
David Summers (diplomat), Canadian High Commissioner to Malaysia
 Dave Summers, fictional character on the Australian soap opera Neighbours